The Allende family is a Chilean family of Spanish descent. They became well known during the 19th century and are based in Santiago. They have played a very significant role in Chilean politics.

Relatives 

Ramón Allende Padín (1845–1884), physician and politician, chief of the Chilean Army Medical Corps during the War of the Pacific (1879–1884), author of various important scientific publications, freemason; married to Eugenia Castro del Fierro (1850–1930)
 Ramón Allende Castro (–1910), subsecretary of the Interior, Foreign Relations and Justice (1891).
 Salvador Allende Castro (1871–1932), journalist, lawyer, freemason, and member of the Radical Party of Chile; married to Laura Gossens Uribe (1877–1962)
Salvador Allende Gossens (1908–1973), senator, member of the Socialist Party of Chile, freemason, President of Chile (1970–1973); married to Hortensia Bussi Soto (1914–2009), First Lady of Chile (1970–1973)
Beatriz Allende Bussi (1943–1977), revolutionary, daughter of Salvador Allende; married to Luis Fernández Oña (1936–2016), Cuban diplomat
Maya Fernández Allende (born 1971), president of the chamber of deputies (2018–2019), Minister of Defense (2022-2026); married to Tomás Monsalve Egaña
Alejandro Fernández Allende (born 1973), Cuban homosexual rights activist
Isabel Allende Bussi (born 1945), Chilean politician, first woman to serve as president of the Senate
Gonzalo Meza Allende (1965–2010), activist for the "No" option in the 1988 plebiscite, founder and member of the Party for Democracy, councilor of La Granja (1992–1996)
Marcia Tambutti Allende (born 1971), biologist, writer, director
Carmen Allende Bussi (born 1947), teacher, founder of the Salvador Allende Foundation
Laura Allende Gossens (1911–1981), politician, sister of Salvador Allende; married to Gastón Pascal Lyon (1909–1993)
Denise Pascal Allende (born 1940), politician
Andrés Pascal Allende (born 1943), revolutionary
Ines Allende Gossens
Tomás Allende Castro (1875–?); married to Laura Pesce Guerra (1869–?) 
Tomás Allende Pesce (1907–?), diplomatic official; married to Francisca Llona Barros (1920–2018) 
Juan Allende Llona (born 1942), associate professor of Political Science at Agnes Scott College in Decatur, Georgia
Isabel Allende Llona (born 1942), writer
Paula Frías Allende (1963–1992), humanitarian activist
Nicolás Frías Allende (born 1966)
Guillermo Allende Castro (1881–?); godfather of Salvador Allende Gossens

Other members 
Pedro Pascal (born 1975), actor, son of Verónica Pascal Ureta, the cousin of Andrés Pascal Allende
Lux Pascal (born 1992), actress and transgender activist, sister of Pedro Pascal

References

External links 

Family information from official Salvador Allende site 
Extensive family tree 

 
Chilean families
Chilean families of Basque ancestry
Salvador Allende